"Live and Die For Hip Hop" is a song by American rap duo Kris Kross, released as the second and final single from their third album, Young, Rich & Dangerous (1996). It is their ninth and final single overall, and features rap stars Da Brat, Jermaine Dupri, Mr. Black and background vocals by R&B star Aaliyah. The song contains a sample of "Baby Come to Me" by Regina Belle. It was not as successful as "Tonite's tha Night", however it did gain some success, making it to #72 on the Billboard Hot 100 and #11 on the Hot Rap Singles chart. A remix was made featuring DJ Clark Kent.

Critical reception
Larry Flick from Billboard wrote, "The new and mature Kris Kross will easily continue picking up props and credibility with this second single from the fine Young, Rich And Dangerous. Employing samples of "Baby Come To Me" by Regina Belle and "I Can't Believe" by Mother's Finest, producer Jermaine Dupri lays a chilled, soulful musical vibe for the lads to flex their rhyming muscles—which they do with jock-grabbin' confidence. Smooth enough to make the grade at top 40 radio. Check it out."

Music video
The accompanying music video for "Live and Die for Hip Hop" was directed by David Nelson and premiered on BET, MTV, MTV 2, VH-1 and Fuse in 1996.

Single track listing
"Live and Die for Hip Hop" featuring Da Brat, Jermaine Dupri, Mr. Black and Aaliyah (extended LP version) - 4:49
"Live and Die for Hip Hop" (radio extended version) - 4:49 
"Live and Die for Hip Hop" (LP version instrumental) - 3:43 
"Live and Die for Hip Hop" featuring DJ Clark Kent (DJ Clark Kent Mix) - 3:47 
"Live and Die for Hip Hop" (DJ Clark Kent Mix Instrumental) - 3:47 
"Tonite's tha Night" featuring Redman (remix) - 3:22

References

1996 singles
Aaliyah songs
Jermaine Dupri songs
Kris Kross songs
Songs written by Jermaine Dupri
Song recordings produced by Jermaine Dupri
Songs written by Narada Michael Walden
Songs written by Da Brat
Songs written by Jeffrey E. Cohen
1996 songs
Def Jam Recordings singles